The National Capital Region Athletic Association (NCRAA) is an athletic association in Metro Manila (National Capital Region), Philippines established in 1993. It is primarily held during the second semester of a school around November until February.

Basketball and Volleyball are the centerpiece sports of the league but it also stage several events as well.

In 2016, the league merged with the Universities and Colleges of Luzon Athletic Association to become the NCR-UCL Athletic Association. However, the merger only lasted for one season and was dissolved at the end of its maiden season. NCRAA will be operating again as a separate entity beginning in November 2017.  For continuity purposes, the NCRAA considers the lone NCRUCLAA season as its 24th season.

Member schools

Past member schools
AMA University 
Arellano University (Prior to joining the NCAA)
Asian College of Science and Technology
Colegio de San Lorenzo
De La Salle University (Team B)
De La Salle-College of Saint Benilde (Prior to joining the NCAA)
De Ocampo Memorial College
Emilio Aguinaldo College (Prior to joining the NCAA)
Lyceum of the Philippines University (Prior to joining the NCAA)
National College of Business and Arts
PMI Colleges (Philippine Maritime Institute)
Universidad de Manila
St. Clare College of Caloocan
New Era University
University of Makati
Technological Institute of the Philippines
Rizal Technological University

Men's basketball champions
 1993: PSBA def. St. Francis 
 1994: St. Francis def. PSBA 
 1995: PSBA def. PUP
 1996: St. Francis def. PSBA
 1997: St. Francis def. PSBA
 1998: DLSU def. St. Francis
 1999: DLSU def. St. Francis
 2000: St. Francis def. Lyceum
 2001: St. Francis def. Lyceum
 2002: St. Francis def. PSBA
 2003-04: St. Francis def. PSBA
 2004-05: EAC def. Colegio de San Lorenzo
 2005-06: St. Francis def. Arellano
 2006-07: Arellano def. EAC
 2007-08: Arellano def. St Francis
 2008-09: Universal College def. Arellano
 2009-10: Olivarez College def. RTU
 2010-11: Colegio de Santa Monica def. RTU
 2011-12: PMMS def. OC
 2012-13: Olivarez College
 2013-14: Saint Clare College of Caloocan def. PMMS
 2014-15: PMMS
 2015-16: PMMS
 2016-17: Colegio de San Lorenzo def. De Ocampo Memorial College
 2017-18: Olivarez College
 2018-19: Centro Escolar University def. PMMS

Recent Juniors basketball champions
 2006-07: Arellano Def. EAC
 2007-08: Olivarez College def. Arellano
 2008-09: Arellano def. RTU
 2009-10: RTU def. Olivarez College

Recent Women's basketball champions
 2006-07: DLSU-Dasmariñas def. PUP
 2007-08: RTU def. EAC

Recent Men's volleyball champions
 2004-05: DLSU-Dasmariñas def. St Francis
 2005-06: DLSU-Dasmariñas def. St Francis
 2006-07: DLSU-Dasmariñas def. St Francis
 2007-08: DLSU-Dasmariñas def. St Francis

Recent Women's volleyball champions
 2004-05: DLSU-Dasmariñas def. La Salle
 2005-06: DLSU-Dasmariñas
 2006-07: DLSU-Dasmariñas
 2007-08: RTU def. St Francis

Student sport in the Philippines
Sports in Metro Manila
1993 establishments in the Philippines